The Presidential Legislative Liaison Office (PLLO) is a government agency of the Philippines that deals with the relations between the executive and legislative branch of governments. The PLLO coordinates affairs regarding the executive government's legislative agenda with the Congress of the Philippines.

History
The Presidential Legislative Liaison Office (PLLO) was established on November 11, 1987 through Memorandum Order No. 128 issued during the Presidency of Corazon Aquino. The issuance was amended by Memorandum Order No. 142 dated December 17, 1987. The latter issuance made effective Memorandum Order No. 128 on July 1, 1987.

References

1987 establishments in the Philippines
Government agencies of the Philippines